Elaidinization is any chemical reaction which convert a cis- olefin to a trans- olefin in unsaturated fatty acids.  This is often performed on fats and oils to increase both the melting point and the shelf life without reducing the degree of unsaturation. The term originates from elaidic acid, the trans-isomer of oleic acid.

Reaction
Elaidinization of oleic acid, a common component of vegetable oils, yields its trans-isomer elaidic acid.

References

Organic reactions